Galactofuranosylgalactofuranosylrhamnosyl-N-acetylglucosaminyl-diphospho-decaprenol beta-1,5/1,6-galactofuranosyltransferase (GlfT2) is an enzyme with systematic name UDP-alpha-D-galactofuranose:beta-D-galactofuranosyl-(1->5)-beta-D-galactofuranosyl-(1->4)-alpha-L-rhamnopyranosyl-(1->3)-N-acetyl-alpha-D-glucosaminyl-diphospho-trans,octacis-decaprenol 4-beta/5-beta-D-galactofuranosyltransferase. This enzyme catalyses the following chemical reaction

 28 UDP-alpha-D-galactofuranose + beta-D-galactofuranosyl-(1->5)-beta-D-galactofuranosyl-(1->4)-alpha-L-rhamnopyranosyl-(1->3)-N-acetyl-alpha-D-glucosaminyl-diphospho-trans,octacis-decaprenol  28 UDP + [beta-D-galactofuranosyl-(1->5)-beta-D-galactofuranosyl-(1->6)]14-beta-D-galactofuranosyl-(1->5)-beta-D-galactofuranosyl-(1->4)-alpha-L-rhamnopyranosyl-(1->3)-N-acetyl-alpha-D-glucosaminyl-diphospho-trans,octacis-decaprenol

This enzyme is solated from Mycobacterium tuberculosis.

References

External links 

EC 2.4.1